Frank Seaton Turner (born July 6, 1947) is an American politician who represented District 13 in the Maryland House of Delegates and is a past chairman of the Howard County Delegation.

Background

Born in Mount Pleasant, New York, July 6, 1947. North Carolina College at Durham, B.A. (social science), 1978; University of North Carolina School of Law; North Carolina Central University School of Law, J.D., 1973. Assistant Professor (business law & legal environment), Earl G. Graves School of Business and Management, Morgan State University

In 2014, the ballfields at Blandair regional park were named after Turner for securing Program Open Space funding for the project.

In the legislature
Member of House of Delegates from January 11, 1995 to January 9, 2019. Member, Ways and Means Committee, 2007- (chair, gambling subcommittee, 2007-).

Legislative notes
voted for legalized gambling in Maryland (HB359)
 voted to increase taxes in 2007(HB2)
 voted in favor of in-state tuition for illegal immigrants in 2007 (HB6)

Election results

General election results, 2006
2006 Race for Maryland House of Delegates – 13th District
Voters to choose three:
{| class="wikitable"
|-
!Name
!Votes
!Percent
!Outcome
|-
|- 
|Guy Guzzone, Democratic
|26,891
|  22.3%
|   Won
|-
|- 
|Shane E. Pendergrass, Democratic
|26,633
|  22.1%
|   Won
|-
|- 
|Frank S. Turner, Democratic
|24,437
|  20.3%
|   Won
|-
|- 
|Mary Beth Tung, Republican
|15,216
|  12.6%
|   Lost
|-
|- 
|Rick Bowers, Republican
|13,665
|  11.4%
|   Lost
|-
|- 
|Loretta Gaffney, Republican
|13,466
|  11.2%
|   Lost
|-
|- 
|Other write-ins
|84
|  0.1%
|   Lost
|-
|}

References

Democratic Party members of the Maryland House of Delegates
African-American state legislators in Maryland
1947 births
Living people
People from Mount Pleasant, New York
People from Columbia, Maryland
21st-century American politicians
21st-century African-American politicians
20th-century African-American people